Yahad (lit. Together) was a centrist political party in Israel during the 1980s.

Background
The party was formed by Ezer Weizman prior to the 1984 elections. Weizman had previously been an MK for Likud during the ninth Knesset, but had been ejected from the party after taking dovish positions on disputes concerning the peace process and settlements in the West Bank and for considering forming a new party with Moshe Dayan.

The party managed to win three seats in the election, taken by Weizman, Binyamin Ben-Eliezer and Shlomo Amar. They were invited to join Yitzhak Shamir's coalition government, and Weizman became Minister without Portfolio.

Shortly after the Knesset came into session, the party joined the Alignment. Weizman became Minister of Science and Technology in the twelfth Knesset, and later served as President of Israel from 1993 to 2000. Ben-Eliezer later served as Minister of Housing and Construction, Minister of Communications, Minister of Defence and Minister of National Infrastructure, whilst Amar failed to retain his seat in the 1988 elections.

External links
Yahad Knesset website

Defunct political parties in Israel
Zionist political parties in Israel
Centrist parties in Israel
Political parties established in 1984
1984 establishments in Israel
Political parties with year of disestablishment missing